Peter Pan is the second studio album by Italian singer-songwriter Ultimo, released by Honiro Label on 9 February 2018.
The album was preceded by the single "Il ballo delle incertezze", which competed in the 69th Sanremo Music Festival, placing first in the "New Proposals" competition.

It debuted at number four on the Italian FIMI Albums Chart; one year after its released, it peaked at number one.

Track listing

Charts

Weekly charts

Year-end charts

Certifications

References

2018 albums
Italian-language albums